Joshua Stick (born 12 February 1980) is a former football (soccer) player who represented New Zealand at international level.

He represented New Zealand at the 1997 FIFA U-17 World Championship, playing in all three group games.

Stick made a solitary official international appearance for the New Zealand national team in a 3–1 win over Vanuatu on 21 June 2000.

References

External links

1980 births
Living people
New Zealand association footballers
New Zealand international footballers
2000 OFC Nations Cup players
Association football midfielders